The Starlight coupe is a unique 2-door body style that was offered by Studebaker Corporation of South Bend, Indiana (United States) from 1947 to 1955 on its Champion and Commander model series. It was designed by Virgil Exner, formerly of Raymond Loewy Associates along the lines of the ponton style that had just gone mainstream after the WWII.

Trunk

The most striking feature was the extremely long (for a five-passenger car) hood-like cover over the luggage compartment of the sedan which was exaggerated on the Starlight. Critics of the radically styled models commented by asking the rhetorical question, "Which way is it going?" (Comedian Fred Allen quipped: "Next year Studebaker is coming out with a model that you won't be able to tell if it is going sideways".) The viewer's astonishment was compounded by the great expanse of the wrap-around rear window. Previously cars had tended to shroud back-seat passengers.

Wrap-around rear window
Unlike other pillared two-door sedans that use two side windows separated from the rear window by roof supports, Loewy created a roof rounded at the rear with a wraparound window system that provided a panoramic effect, similar to a railroad observation car. The curved window was achieved with four fixed panels of glass. The roof was supported by two wide pillars (sometimes called "B" pillars) immediately behind the doors and in front of the wraparound back window. The body style was originally named, simply, "5-passenger coupe"; however, for the 1949 model year it was renamed Starlight Coupe.

The car's unique profile provided the Studebaker marque with an easily recognized body shape copied as soon as possible by the other US manufacturers in their 1949 models, and appeared to be influenced by the Lockheed P-38 Lightning, particularly by the shortened fuselage with wrap around canopy. Studebaker followed a styling trend soon after the war of adopting fighter aircraft appearances on their products, as demonstrated on Buick and Cadillac vehicles starting in 1948.

Specifications

 V-8 introduced in 1951.  
 Automatic transmission introduced in 1950.

Facelift

For 1950 and 1951, all Studebakers received a freshening of the 1947 design with the addition of the "bullet nose" (or "spinner") front sheet metal design, sharing a similar appearance with the 1949 Ford sedan. When combined with the Starlight body style, Studebakers looked comparatively futuristic at the time. This version of the Starlight body style continued until the end of the 1952 model year, when it was sold side by side with a hardtop "Starliner" version of the same model.

New body and a name-change

For 1953 designer Robert E Bourke, head of Raymond Loewy Associates Studebaker design operation, radically redesigned all Studebaker cars. Studebaker sedans rode on an  wheelbase, although emphasis was placed on the sports car-like Raymond Loewy-designed 2-door coupes that rode on Studebaker's longer  wheelbase.

Offered in both Champion and Commander model ranges, the coupes were available as pillared and hardtop body styles. Hardtop coupes were designated Starliners while the Starlight designation was applied to the five window pillared coupes. The styling on both these later (1953) cars influenced the Hillman Minx of the late 1950s and 1960s, which was also designed by Raymond Loewy.

In late 1952 Studebaker produced one 1953 Commander convertible as an engineering study to determine if the model could be profitably mass-produced. The car was based on the 1953 2-door hardtop coupe. The car was later modified to 1954-model specifications, and was occasionally driven around South Bend by engineers. Additional structural reinforcements were needed to reduce body flexure. Even though the car was equipped with the 232 cu. in. V-8, the added structural weight increased the car's 0-60 mph acceleration time to an unacceptable level. In addition, the company did not have the financial resources to add another body type to the model line. The company's leadership mistakenly thought the 2-door sedans, 4-door sedans, and 1954 Conestoga wagon would sell better than the 2-door coupes, so the company's resources were focused on production of the sedans and the wagon. When the prototype convertible was no longer needed, engineer E. T. Reynolds ordered the car to be stripped and the body sent to the secret graveyard at the proving grounds. A non-engineering employee requested permission to purchase the car, rather than see it rot away with the other prototypes. Chief engineer Gene Hardig discussed the request with E. T. Reynolds. They agreed to let the employee purchase the car on the condition that the employee never sell it. In the 1970s, the car was re-discovered behind a South Bend gas station and no longer owned by the former employee. After eventually passing through several owners, the car is now in a private collection of Studebaker automobiles.

For 1955 the pillared Starlight reverted to "5-passenger coupe", the pillarless "Starliner" became "5-passenger hardtop."

For 1956 these 5-passenger 2-door coupes with pillars were heavily modified and reissued as the Studebaker Hawk series.

In 1958, Studebaker again applied the Starlight name to a body style, this time on its first full-sized hardtop models since 1952. With lackluster sales and a switch to the compact Lark, the company no longer was in need of the Starlight moniker and it was permanently retired at the end of the model year.

Oldsmobile would attempt an effect similar to the Starlight in 1977 with its Toronado XS model. Unlike the Studebaker, however, advances in auto glass production allowed the Toronado wrap around window to be manufactured in one sheet of glass that was bent using "hot wire" technology.

References

Starlight
Coupés
Cars introduced in 1947
1950s cars